Satner is a village in Athner tehsil, Betul district, India. Its population is greater than 2000. It is the second largest gram panchayat of Athner block. There is a temple situated at the center of the village which is "gadi wali maiya", whole villagers worship there, and celebrates festival of navratri. 

Villages in Betul district